"Take It Off" is a song recorded by American rapper Lil Jon featuring Puerto Rican singer Yandel and Mexican-American singer Becky G. The song was released on July 22, 2016.

Commercial performance
"Take It Off" debuted at number 48 on the Billboard Hot Latin Songs and peaked at number 45 on October 29, 2016.

Music video
The music video premiered via Lil Jon's Vevo channel on October 4, 2016. It was shot in Las Vegas, Nevada and directed by Daniel Duran. The music video has over 12 million views as of January 2019.

Charts

Release history

References

2016 singles
Lil Jon songs
Yandel songs
Becky G songs
Songs written by Lil Jon
Songs written by Yandel
Spanglish songs
Kemosabe Records singles
Songs written by Becky G